Ric Throssell (10 May 192220 April 1999) was an Australian diplomat and author whose writings included novels, plays, film and television scripts, and memoirs. For most of his professional life as a diplomat his career was dogged by unproven allegations that he either leaked classified information to his mother, the writer and communist Katharine Susannah Prichard, or was himself a spy for the Soviet Union.

Early life
Richard Prichard Throssell was born in 1922 in Western Australia, in the Perth suburb of Greenmount. His father was Hugo Throssell, a winner of the Victoria Cross at Gallipoli in 1915, and son of a former Premier of Western Australia, George Throssell. His mother was the writer Katharine Susannah Prichard. Ric was their only child. He was nicknamed after his father's late brother Frank Erick "Ric" Cottrell Throssell, who was killed at the 2nd Battle of Gaza in 1917. He attended Wesley College, Perth, and was a founding member of the Wesley Hundred, a charitable organisation that worked with the poor.

On 19 November 1933, while his mother was on a six-month visit to the Soviet Union, his father Hugo committed suicide. His business ventures had failed in the Great Depression, and he had been offered just ten shillings ($1) by a pawnbroker for his Victoria Cross. In his suicide note he entertained the hope that his wife would now qualify for a war widow's pension, which was approved.

Army and diplomatic service
Ric Throssell enlisted in the Australian Army in World War II, and was promoted to lance corporal. He was offered the opportunity of officer training on the basis of being the son of a VC winner, but declined on principle. He served in New Guinea. In 1943, he joined the diplomatic service, his first posting being to Moscow in 1945, as Third Secretary. His first wife, Elwyn Hague "Bea" ( Gallacher), a stenographer in the Attorney-General's Office in Canberra, died suddenly in 1946 while they were in Moscow. After returning to Canberra, he met and married Dorothy "Dodie" Jordan in 1947. Like his mother Katharine, Dodie was born in Fiji. In the late 1940s he was an adviser to H. V. Evatt in the latter's capacity as President of the United Nations General Assembly. From 1949 to 1951 he was posted at the Australian Embassy in Rio de Janeiro, Brazil.

His mother was a founding member of the Communist Party of Australia in 1919, and remained a member for the rest of her life. Dodie was never formally a member of the party, but had participated in guerrilla training in the Dandenong Ranges as a member of its youth arm, the Eureka Youth League. 

Due to these associations and the Cold War tensions of the time, Throssell became a person of interest to the Australian Security Intelligence Organisation (ASIO). In 1954, the Soviet defector Vladimir Petrov named him as a spy, alleging he had given information to Walter Seddon Clayton (who was later proven to be a Soviet agent with the codename 'KLOD') and he was questioned for a week by the Royal Commission on Espionage, created soon after the Petrov affair. The questioning concerned his contact with Russians in Australia, and whether he had told his mother anything about his work. The Royal Commission eventually concurred in his vehement denials of any intentional espionage, although it stated that he may have inadvertently let drop classified information to people in the circles in which he moved. For example, one of his close friends was Jim Hill (also named by Petrov), brother of the Victorian Communist Party leader Ted Hill, who later broke away to form a Maoist group.

Although Throssell was officially exonerated, his career was stymied from that point onwards. On ASIO's advice he was repeatedly denied access to highly classified documents, and was refused promotion in the then Department of External Affairs. In 1955, the Secretary of the Department, Arthur Tange, even wrote to the Solicitor-General asking if there were grounds for having Throssell dismissed from the Public Service; the reply said that "no charge against Throssell could possibly succeed". Nevertheless, the smears and suspicion continued unabated and Tange maintained a correspondence with ASIO about Throssell.

However, he played an important role in administering the Colombo Plan, and in 1962 led the formation of the department's Cultural Relations Branch.
In 1974, the new departmental head, Alan Renouf, sought to use his influence to have Throssell security cleared to a higher level, but the CIA threatened to cut security ties with the Whitlam government and the plan foundered.

In 1980 he was appointed Director of the Commonwealth Foundation in London, an Assistant Secretary-level position. That post required the unanimous concurrence of all Commonwealth prime ministers. He remained there until ill health forced his retirement in 1983.

Spying allegations
In 1996, certain transcripts of secret Soviet diplomatic communications known as the Venona decrypts were released in Washington. Before they were released in Australia, the Department of Foreign Affairs and Trade asked Throssell if he wanted his name deleted. He replied that he was as interested as anyone in finally discovering what had been said about him, and approved of the unredacted release. It proved to contain three innocuous references to him, the substance of which had all been canvassed in the Royal Commission 42 years earlier. Nevertheless, Throssell was re-branded a spy on the front page of the Brisbane Courier-Mail under the headline "Confirmed: Our Soviet Spies", along with a photo of him in the company of British traitors Guy Burgess and Donald Maclean. The paper later issued an apology.

In 1998, Desmond Ball and David Horner published their book Breaking the Codes, which for the first time detailed the full extent of ASIO's case against Throssell. This included a claim that he actively cooperated with the KGB when he was representing Australia in Brazil in the late 1940s. David Horner went on to publish the Official History of ASIO as its lead author and editor. The first volume, the Spy Catchers (2014), discusses Throssell's case:

In 2012, further allegations against Throssell were made based on information from Coral Bell, who had been his junior colleague in the Department of External Affairs in 1947 and who believed he had attempted to recruit her to the spy ring.

Attempts to clear his name
Under Freedom of Information laws that had been introduced in 1982, Throssell was now able to gain access to some ASIO documents previously denied him. These painted what he called "another self, a secret person portrayed by the anonymous men of the Australian intelligence services". He also had considerable dealings with the Administrative Appeals Tribunal on these matters. In 1983, the newly elected Hawke Government had his case reconsidered and, on the advice of ASIO, declined to reveal its determination on the basis that the Venona decrypts still required "the highest level of protection".

Later life
In 1983, to help fund the production of the film The Pursuit of Happiness, based on a book by his daughter Karen Throssell, he donated his father's Victoria Cross to People for Nuclear Disarmament. The Returned and Services League of Australia bought the medal and presented it to the Australian War Memorial, where it is displayed.

Throssell was an active member of Canberra Repertory Theatre as a director, writer and actor.

Death
His wife Dodie died on 20 April 1999 after a long illness, and he committed suicide later the same day. They were survived by three of their children and five grandchildren.

Bibliography

Fiction

Novels
A Reliable Source (1991)
In the Wilderness of Mirrors (1992)
Tomorrow (1997)
Jackpot (1998)

Plays
Devil Wear Black (1955)
 The Day Before Tomorrow (1956)
For Valour (1958)
about 25 other plays

Non-fiction
My Father's Son (runner-up in the Banjo Non-Fiction Awards 1989; revised version 1997, with a new postscript, "The Last Knot Untied", stating that he "had been a victim of the intelligence game for most of my life".)
Wild Weeds and Wind Flowers: The Life and Letters of Katharine Susannah Prichard (1975)

He also edited two collections of his mother's writings:
Straight Left (1982)
Tribute: Selected Stories of Katharine Susannah Prichard (1988)

Notes

Sources

1922 births
1999 deaths
Australian diplomats
Australian biographers
Male biographers
Suicides in the Australian Capital Territory
20th-century Australian novelists
20th-century Australian dramatists and playwrights
20th-century biographers
Australian male novelists
Australian male dramatists and playwrights
Katharine Susannah Prichard
1999 suicides
Australian Army personnel of World War II
Australian Army soldiers
Australian expatriates in the United States
Australian expatriates in Brazil
Australian expatriates in the United Kingdom